Spear is a 2022 fantasy novella by Nicola Griffith. It is a queer feminist retelling of the myth of Percival and the Holy Grail.

Plot

In Ystrad Tywi, an unnamed girl lives with her mother Elen. Elen tells the girl stories about the Tuath Dé and their treasures. Elen implies that the girl is the daughter of one of the Tuath, and that Elen stole Dagda's Cauldron before fleeing into the wilderness with her daughter. As the girl grows, she develops the ability to move unseen and to communicate with animals. She uses these abilities to save a group of knights from bandits; these knights are Companions in service to King Arturus of Caer Leon. The girl decides to leave her mother. Elen names her Peretur after the Tuatha's spear; she then casts a geas which prevents Peretur from speaking of her childhood.

Peretur disguises herself as a boy and travels toward Caer Leon, following visions of a magical lake. She challenges Cei, the king's reeve, and disarms him; he presents her before Arturus and Gwenhwyfar. Arturus declines to accept Peretur as a knight because she is unable to reveal her parentage. Peretur meets Nimuë, Arturus's chief counsellor and the keeper of the lake that Peretur has been seeing in her visions. Peretur accidentally breaks Elen's geas.

Nimüe reveals that Myrddyn, the king's sorcerer, was seeking the four treasures of the Tuath Dé. While powerful, these treasures will eventually corrupt their mortal owners. Myrddyn helped Arturus to find the Sword Caledfwylch as well as the Stone, which can seal things away from the mortal world. Nimüe was horrified by Myrddyn's lust for power, so she trapped him in a magical coma and sealed him within the Stone. Nimüe plans to remove the treasures from the world to protect humanity.

Nimüe and Peretur make love. Peretur learns that her father Manandán is seeking both Elen and the Cauldron. Elen sends out a cry which is sensed by many mortals; Arturus's Companions begin having dreams of the Holy Grail. Peretur tells Arturus that she is Myrrdyn's nephew; he allows her to accompany Nimüe and Llanza to search for the Grail. The group rides to Peretur's childhood home. Elen has committed suicide rather than be found by Manandán. Peretur and her father fight; she kills him with his own spear and claims the weapon for herself. Nimüe is stabbed by Manandán in the commotion, but Peretur heals her with the power of the bowl. With his sister Elen's death, Myrddyn dies as well.

They return to Caer Leon and tell Gwenhwyfar to drink from the bowl in order to heal her infertility. In truth, they have replaced the bowl with a fake. The real one is sealed with the Stone in order to keep Arturus from producing an heir. Nimüe believes that Arturus would have spawned a line of tyrannical rulers, but allowing his lineage to die out will bring peace. Peretur holds Nimüe in her arms as they discuss whether they made the right choice.

Major themes

According to T.S. Miller of Strange Horizons, Peretur's childhood at first has more in common with the story of Grendel and his mother rather than many Arthurian legends; they live alone in a cave, cut off from contact with the outside world. Peretur journeys away from Elen's myths into the "real world", and then back into they mythic realm of Arthurian mythology.

Griffith makes an effort to explore queerness, disability, and ethnic diversity. While many Arthurian stories are predominantly white and male-centric, Griffith explores the way in which the Roman Empire made medieval Britain " a more cosmopolitan place than most modern Arthurian adaptations imagine." For example, Llanza is her version of Lancelot; he is Asturian and walks with a limp. Peretur treats her attraction to women as a matter of fact, and there is an implied polyamorous connection between Arturus, Gwenhwyfar, and Llanza rather than the traditional love triangle.

Style

According to a review in Strange Horizons, the Welsh orthography of several characters' names, including Gwenhwyfar and Myrddyn, conjure a "Celtic Arthur", providing a geographic explanation for the presence of the Irish Tuath Dé.

Background

The idea for the book originally came about after Griffith was invited to contribute to Sword Stone Table, an anthology of Arthurian retellings from Swapna Krishna and Jenn Northington.

Reception

A review for Chicago Review of Books called the work "an instant classic, born of classics." The review praised the novel's exploration of gender and sexuality, writing that Griffith "threads the needle" by incorporating queer and polyamorous characters without couching their identities in modern language. Writing for Locus, Gary K. Wolfe praised Griffith's research into 6th century Wales as the setting for the story. Wolfe praised the lyrical, slow-moving introduction to the novel, which allows us to familiarize ourselves with Griffith's version of many familiar characters. By the end of the novel, Wolfe writes that "it no longer feels at all like yet another iteration of familiar matters, but a marvel­ously concise epic that is entirely Griffith’s own." Writing for the New York Times, author Amal El-Mohtar praised the attention to historical detail and calling Peretur's journey "a pleasure to follow". Publishers Weekly called the novel "an ideal pick for fans of retold legends, as well as those looking for diverse fantasy", writing that the work cements Griffith's reputation as a "consummate storyteller".

A review for Tor.com praised the work's exploration of contradictions, calling it both a "bold retelling" while still being familiar. A review in Kirkus called the novel "fresh [and] often lovely", praising the subversion of many fantasy tropes; however the same review noted that the ending felt abrupt and "not entirely gratifying".

References

Modern Arthurian fiction
Historical fantasy novels
Novels with lesbian themes
2020s LGBT novels
LGBT speculative fiction novels
Tor Books books